Yargal is a village situated at Bijapur district in Karnataka (India). It has population of around 5000. It hosts a Jevanta samadhi of Shri SiddhaShankaranand yogi from Nath Sampraday.

Villages in Bijapur district, Karnataka